Anastasiya Skryabina (born 10 May 1985) is an alpine skier from Ukraine.  She competed for Ukraine at the 2010 Winter Olympics.  Her best result was a 34th in the super-G.

References

External links
 
 
 

1985 births
Living people
Ukrainian female alpine skiers
Olympic alpine skiers of Ukraine
Alpine skiers at the 2010 Winter Olympics